E. Vincent Davis was a Democratic member of the Mississippi Senate, representing the 36th District during 2008 and 2009.

Davis was appointed Chancery Judge for the 17th Chancery Court District (Adams, Claiborne, Jefferson, and Wilkinson Counties) on December 7, 2009.

References

External links

Project Vote Smart - Senator E. Vincent Davis profile
Follow the Money - E Vincent Davis
2007 2003 campaign contributions

Democratic Party Mississippi state senators
Mississippi lawyers
1963 births
Living people
People from Jefferson Davis County, Mississippi
Alcorn State University alumni